Anne Juuko (born c. 1981), is a Ugandan investment banker and corporate executive, who is the managing director and chief executive officer of Stanbic Bank Uganda Limited, the largest commercial bank in the country, by assets, valued at US$1.6 billion in June 2019. She took up this appointment on 1 March 2020.

Background and education
She was born in the Central Region of Uganda in the 1980s. She attended local primary and secondary schools, before being admitted to Makerere University, Uganda's largest and oldest public university. She graduated with a Bachelor of Commerce degree from there. Her second degree, a Master of Strategic Planning, was obtained from Heriot-Watt University Business School, in Edinburgh, Scotland, United Kingdom. Ms Juuko has also completed various professional courses and programmes in leadership and management.

Career
She started her banking career in 2001. For a period in the 2000s, she served as Vice President and Head of Fixed Income, Currencies and Commodities at Citibank Uganda Limited. She was then transferred to Citibank Kenya Limited, serving there as Vice President, Customer Sales and Derivatives Marketing, for two years, from June 2010 until June 2012.

In 2012, she was hired by Standard Bank Group, as head of Global Markets for Stanbic Bank Uganda, serving in that capacity until December 2017. In January 2018, she took up a new appointment as Head of Corporate and Investment Banking at Standard Bank Namibia, a role she served in until February 2020.

On 1 March 2020, Juuko replaced Patrick Mweheire, as CEO of Stanbic Bank Uganda, becoming the first female Ugandan to serve in this position. Mweheire was appointed Regional Chief Executive at Standard Bank Group, responsible for Ethiopia, Kenya, Tanzania, Uganda and South Sudan.

Awards and honors
As head of Global Markets, at Stanbic Bank Uganda, Juuko won the Primary Dealer of the Year award for 6 consecutive years.

Family
She is married to lawyer Apollo Nelson Makubuya a partner at MMAKS Advocates a commercial law firm in Kampala, Uganda

See also
 Stanbic Bank
 Standard Bank Group
 List of banks in Uganda
 Apollo Makubuya

References

External links
 Website of Stanbic Bank Uganda Limited
  Anne Juuko named new Stanbic chief executive as Patrick Mweheire moves to regional unit As of 25 February 2020.
 Stanbic Bank Uganda: Executive Appointments As of 25 February 2020.

Ganda people
Living people
Ugandan bankers
21st-century Ugandan businesswomen
21st-century Ugandan businesspeople
Makerere University alumni
Alumni of Heriot-Watt University
People from Central Region, Uganda
Ugandan women chief executives
Standard Bank people
Ugandan women business executives
1980s births